The Dynamic Rockers is a Dutch Rock and roll band from Tilburg formed in 1954 by Henk van Broekhoven aka Hank Brooklyn later known as John Spencer, Sjef Haans, Peter Smulders and Peter van den Heuvel. The quartet is mainly known in the Netherlands for their Dutch covers of American Rock and roll hits. The band released four singles on the Belgian label Helia in the early sixties and performed in the popular television show Tienerklanken.

In 1986 The Dynamic Rockers also recorded and produced for Dutch singers such as Miss Dynamite and Country Annie for singles released on the label Pico.

In 1991, the Dutch record label Rarity Records released the compilation In His Early Days by The Dynamic Rockers Featuring John Spencer that includes 16 songs.  The second and third volume of In His Early Days are then released in 1992.

Discography

Singles
 1980: The Dynamic Rockers - Heimwee Naar Blue Bayou / Anna [Dureco Benelux]
 1981: The Dynamic Rockers - Jenny Kom Bij Me (Ginny Come Lately) / Dan Nog Eenmaal Met Mij (Save The Last Dance For Me) [CNR]
 1983: The Dynamic Rockers -  'k Stuurde Je Rode Rozen (18 Yellow Roses) / 'k Ben 'n Nul (I'm A Nut) [Flits]
 1983: The Dynamic Rockers - Blijf Bij Mij Vannacht (I Need Your Love Tonight) / 't Heeft Geen Zin (The Shape I'm In) [Flits]
 1984: The Dynamic Rockers - Pretty Belinda (Nederlandse Versie) / Razmataz Polka [Pico]
 1984: The Dynamic Rockers -  Honey Bee (Dutch Version) / Hey Lilly (Dutch Version) [Pico]
 1985: The Dynamic Rockers - Ik Ben Zo Ver Van Huis (I'm Coming Home) / Jij Was Van Mij (Just One Time) [Pico]
 1986: The Dynamic Rockers - Let's Go / Italian Lovesong [Pico]
 1986: The Dynamic Rockers - Woe Hoe / De Ontbijtpolka [Pico]

Greatest Hits - Compilations
 1980: The Dynamic Rockers - The Dynamic Rockers [Dureco Benelux]
 1991: The Dynamic Rockers - Volume 1, Featuring John Spencer In His Early Days [Rarity Records]
 1992: The Dynamic Rockers - Volume 2, Featuring John Spencer In His Early Days [Rarity Records]
 1992: The Dynamic Rockers - Volume 3, Featuring John Spencer In His Early Days [Rarity Records]
 Unknown: The Dynamic Rockers - The Dynamic Rockers Nederlandstalig Vol. 1 [Disco Sound]

References

External links

Dutch rock music groups